The 2016 Istanbul Open (also known as the TEB BNP Paribas Istanbul Open for sponsorship purposes) was a men's tennis tournament played on outdoor clay courts. It was the second edition of the Istanbul Open, and an ATP World Tour 250 event. It took place at the Koza World of Sports Arena in Istanbul, Turkey, from 25 April – 1 May 2016.

Singles main draw entrants

Seeds

Rankings are as of April 18, 2016.

Other entrants
The following players received wildcards into the main draw:
  Marsel İlhan
  Cem İlkel
  Karen Khachanov

The following players received entry via the qualifying draw:
  Carlos Berlocq
  Renzo Olivo
  Andrey Rublev
  Adrian Ungur

The following player received entry as a lucky loser:
  Máximo González

Withdrawals
Before the tournament
  Juan Mónaco → replaced by  Filip Krajinović 
  Lucas Pouille → replaced by  Máximo González
  Rajeev Ram → replaced by  Facundo Bagnis

Doubles main draw entrants

Seeds

 Rankings are as of April 18, 2016.

Other entrants
The following pairs received wildcards into the doubles main draw:
  Tuna Altuna /  Dino Marcan
  Cem İlkel /  Bernard Tomic

Withdrawals
During the tournament
  Robert Lindstedt (abdominal injury)
  Adrian Mannarino (hip injury)

Champions

Singles

  Diego Schwartzman def.  Grigor Dimitrov,  6–7(5–7), 7–6(7–4), 6–0

Doubles

  Flavio Cipolla /  Dudi Sela def.  Andrés Molteni /  Diego Schwartzman, 6–3, 5–7, [10–7]

References

External links
Official website

Istanbul Open
2016 in Istanbul
2016 in Turkish tennis
2016
Istanbul Open
Istanbul Open